Carl-Gunnar Wingård (27 February 1894 – 20 January 1977) was a Swedish actor. He appeared in 90 films between 1919 and 1966.

Selected filmography

 Andersson's Kalle (1922)
 New Pranks of Andersson's Kalle (1923)
 Her Little Majesty (1925)
 The Rivals (1926)
Love and the Home Guard (1931)
 A Stolen Waltz (1932)
 Lucky Devils (1932)
 The Song to Her (1934)
 The Atlantic Adventure (1934)
 Adventure in Pyjamas (1935)
 Walpurgis Night (1935)
 Close Relations (1935)
 Shipwrecked Max (1936)
 Poor Millionaires (1936)
 Raggen (1936)
 Hotel Paradise (1937)
 Variety Is the Spice of Life (1939) 
 Whalers (1939)
 The Bjorck Family (1940)
 Lucky Young Lady (1941)
 How to Tame a Real Man (1941)
 The Ghost Reporter (1941)
 Fransson the Terrible (1941)
 We House Slaves (1942)
 She Thought It Was Him (1943)
 Mister Collins' Adventure (1943)
 I Am Fire and Air (1944)
 The Emperor of Portugallia (1944)
 Blood and Fire (1945)
 Poor Little Sven (1947)
 Sköna Helena (1951) - Calchas
 One Fiancée at a Time (1952)
 Speed Fever (1953)
 The Glass Mountain (1953)
 Getting Married (1955)
 Woman in a Fur Coat (1958)
 Only a Waiter (1959)
 Good Friends and Faithful Neighbours (1960)

External links

1894 births
1977 deaths
People from Karlskrona
Swedish male film actors
Swedish male silent film actors
20th-century Swedish male actors